Edward Ward (14 June 1895 – 1971), also known as Ted or Ned Ward, was an English footballer who played as an inside forward in the Football League for Newcastle United, Crystal Palace, Nelson, Darlington and Ashington.

Life and career
Ward was born in Whitehaven, Cumberland, the fifth child of John Ward, a coal miner, and his wife Catherine. By the time of the 1911 census, the family had moved to Cowpen, Northumberland, and the five oldest sons, the 15-year-old Edward included, were all employed at the colliery.

He played football as an amateur for Blyth Spartans before joining Newcastle United at the end of the 1919–20 season. He played 25 matches for Newcastle during the 1920–21 season, 21 in the First Division and 4 in the FA Cup. According to the Derby Daily Telegraph, he was the smallest player in Newcastle's squad, "but his pluck and speed make him a dangerous inside right". He lost his place the following year, and moved on to Crystal Palace for a £250 fee. In December 1923, by which time the player had moved on again, to Nelson, Newcastle were obliged to solicit the Football League's assistance in extracting from Crystal Palace the £150 balance owing from the transfer; the League allowed the claim, and ordered the money be paid by 1 January.

Ward signed for Darlington in November 1924. He played five Third Division North matches, including a 2–1 win against Ashington in which he was involved in both goals. After Darlington secured promotion to the Second Division, Ward was not retained, so he signed for Ashington. He scored twice in his first match for the club, in a 3–3 draw at home to Wigan Borough, and over the next two seasons contributed 10 goals from 25 matches in the Third Division North. He finished his career with spells at two North-Eastern League clubs, Workington, where he was appointed captain, and West Stanley.

The 1939 Register lists him as a single man living with his brother John and sister Catherine in Blyth, Northumberland and occupied as a general labourer (heavy worker). Ward's death was registered in the Northumberland Central district, which included Blyth, Ashington, Bedlington and nearby villages, in the first quarter of 1971.

Notes

References

1895 births
1971 deaths
Sportspeople from Whitehaven
English footballers
Association football inside forwards
Blyth Spartans A.F.C. players
Newcastle United F.C. players
Crystal Palace F.C. players
Nelson F.C. players
Darlington F.C. players
Ashington A.F.C. players
Workington A.F.C. players
West Stanley F.C. players
English Football League players
Date of death missing
Footballers from Cumbria